Johan Stølan (30 March 1939 – 24 October 2016) was a Norwegian politician for the Labour Party.

He served as a deputy representative in the Norwegian Parliament from Sør-Trøndelag during the terms 1977–1981, 1981–1985 and 1985–1989.

On the local level Stølan was mayor of Hemne municipality from 1987 to 2003. He died at the age of 77.

References

1939 births
2016 deaths
People from Hemne
Labour Party (Norway) politicians
Deputy members of the Storting
Mayors of places in Sør-Trøndelag